John Robert McTavish (born 2 February 1932) is a Scottish footballer, who played as a centre-half in the Football League for Manchester City. He returned to his native Scotland with St Mirren as part of the deal which took Gerry Baker to Maine Road in November 1960.

His father Bob and uncle John were also footballers, both featuring for Falkirk and Tottenham Hotspur in the early 20th century.

References

1932 births
Living people
Manchester City F.C. players
Footballers from Glasgow
Association football central defenders
Scottish footballers
Dalry Thistle F.C. players
St Mirren F.C. players
Stranraer F.C. players
English Football League players
Scottish Football League players
Scottish Junior Football Association players